Jack Briscoe (born 25 October 1991) is an English rugby league footballer who last played for Hull F.C. in the Super League. He was dual registered with Championship club the Featherstone Rovers for the 2012 season.

References

1991 births
Living people
English rugby league players
Featherstone Rovers players
Hull F.C. players
Rugby league players from Pontefract
Rugby league wingers
York City Knights players